Pedro A. Colón (born April 7, 1968) is an American jurist and politician who currently serves as a Wisconsin Circuit Court Judge in Milwaukee County.  The first Latino elected to the Wisconsin Legislature, Colón was a Democratic member of the Wisconsin State Assembly, representing the 8th assembly district, from 1999 to 2010.  In 2010, he was appointed to the circuit court by Governor Jim Doyle.

Background 
Born in Ponce, Puerto Rico, April 7, 1968, Colón grew up on the South Side of Milwaukee and graduated from Thomas More High School in Milwaukee. He received his B.A. in political science from Marquette University in 1991, and his J.D. from the University of Wisconsin Law School in 1994.

Political history 
He was first elected to the State Assembly in 1998, making him the first Latino to be elected a member of either house of the Wisconsin Legislature; and was reelected in the next five elections. He served as Vice-Chair of the Joint Committee on Finance and of the Judiciary and Ethics Committee.

He briefly ran for Mayor of Milwaukee in 2003, but withdrew, endorsing and becoming co-chair of the campaign for eventual 2004 election winner Tom Barrett. Colón also ran unsuccessfully for Milwaukee city attorney in 2008 against incumbent Grant Langley.

On May 26, 2010, Colón announced that he was not running for re-election in the 2010 general election, and resigned from the Milwaukee Metropolitan Sewerage District Commission, which he once chaired. The next day, he confirmed that he was applying for a job as the deputy director of legal services at the District, and had resigned to avoid a potential conflict of interest.

Wisconsin Circuit Judge
In September 2010, Governor Jim Doyle appointed Colón a Wisconsin Circuit Court judge for Milwaukee County. He was elected to a full term in the April 5, 2011, spring election, and was subsequently re-elected in 2017.

Personal life 
He is married to Betty J. Ulmer; they have two daughters, Lily and Julia, and live in Walker's Point. Judge Colón is on the board of directors of the National Association of Latino Elected Officials.

References

External links
 
 
 Follow the Money – Pedro A Colón
2006 2004 2002 2000 1998 campaign contributions
Campaign 2008 campaign contributions at Wisconsin Democracy Campaign

Marquette University alumni
University of Wisconsin Law School alumni
American politicians of Puerto Rican descent
Wisconsin state court judges
Hispanic and Latino American state legislators in Wisconsin
Democratic Party members of the Wisconsin State Assembly
Politicians from Milwaukee
Politicians from Ponce
Puerto Rican lawyers
Attorneys from Ponce
1968 births
Living people
21st-century American politicians